Mindanao Association of State Tertiary Schools, Inc. is an association of public Tertiary level schools in the Mindanao region of the Philippines. It is composed of the following schools:

Members

 Basilan State College (BSC)
 Bukidnon State University (BukSU)
 Camiguin Polytechnic State College (CPSC)
 Caraga State University (CSU)
 Central Mindanao University (CMU)
 Cotabato Foundation College of Science and Technology (CFCST)
 Cotabato State University (CotSU)
 Davao del Norte State College (DNSC)
 Davao Oriental State University (DOrSU)
 Jose Rizal Memorial State University (JRMSU)
 J.H. Cerilles State College (JHCSC)
 Mindanao State University Main (MSU Main)
 North Eastern Mindanao State University (NEMSU)
 Philippine Normal University-Agusan Campus (PNU-Agusan Campus)
 Southern Philippines Agri-Business and Marine and Aquatic School of Technology (SPAMAST)
 Sultan Kudarat State University (SKSU)
 Surigao State College of Technology (SSCT)
 University of Science and Technology of Southern Philippines (USTP)
 University of Southeastern Philippines (USeP)
 University of Southern Mindanao (USM)
 Western Mindanao State University (WMSU)
 Zamboanga State College of Marine Sciences and Technology (ZSCMST)
 Zamboanga Peninsula Polytechnic State University (ZPPSU)

Other SUCs
 Adiong Memorial Polytechnic State College (AMPSC)
 Northwestern Mindanao State College of Science and Technology (NMSCST)
 Sulu State College (SSC)
 Mindanao State University – Maguindanao (MSU-Maguindanao)
 Mindanao State University – Gen. Santos (MSU-GenSan)
 Mindanao State University – Iligan Institute of Technology (MSU-IIT)
 Mindanao State University – Naawan (MSU-N)
 Tawi-Tawi Regional Agricultural College (TRAC)

Athletics
The association hold annual games for qualifier in SCUAA meet. This include all sports contest.

Socio-cultural festival
The association hold annual socio-cultural festival for qualifier in PASUC socio cultural meet. This include visual arts, literary and musical contest.

References

 
State universities and colleges in the Philippines
Philippine Association of State Universities and Colleges